Home and Away is a 1956 British second feature drama film directed by Vernon Sewell and starring Jack Warner and Kathleen Harrison. It depicts the life of an ordinary working-class man after he wins the football pools. The film reunited Warner and Harrison who had previously appeared together in the Huggetts series of films.

Plot
After years of doing the football pools every week George Knowles (Jack Warner) is stunned to find that all his score draws have come up and he's won the "Treble Chance" jackpot. As George and his family celebrate with an impromptu party, his son Johnnie (Bernard Fox) arrives home and drops a bombshell: the coupon belongs, not to George, but to Johnnie and his workmate Sid Jarvis (Harry Fowler). But when Sid's gold-digging and wanton mother (Valerie White) finds out about the windfall she decides to lock her son up in order to keep him away from his share of the fortune.

Cast
George Knowles –	Jack Warner
Elsie –	Kathleen Harrison
Mary –	Lana Morris
Ted Groves –	Charles Victor
Margie –	Thora Hird
Mrs. Jarvis –	Valerie White
Syd -	Harry Fowler
Annie Knowles –	Merrie Carroll
Johnnie Knowles – Bernard Fox
Aunt Jean –	Margaret St Barbe West
Al, Mary's Boyfriend – Ross Pendleton
Uncle Tom –	Leslie Henson
Albert West –	Sam Kydd

Critical reception
TV Guide noted, "A few entertaining moments."

References

External links
 

1956 films
1956 drama films
Films directed by Vernon Sewell
British drama films
1950s English-language films
1950s British films
British black-and-white films